Alex Miller (born 4 July 1949) is a Scottish football manager and former player. As a player, he had a 15-year career with Rangers, winning several trophies. As a manager, he won the 1991–92 Scottish League Cup with Hibernian. He subsequently worked for Premier League club Liverpool for nine years, assisting Gérard Houllier and Rafael Benítez.

Playing career
Miller started his playing career with Clydebank Strollers before he made the move to Rangers. He played for Rangers from 1967 until 1982 and made 309 appearances during his spell at Ibrox, scoring 33 goals. After being coached by David White he was promoted to the first team, and won his first medal in the 1970 Scottish League Cup Final. He impressed the supporters having played in the 1971 Scottish Cup Final against Celtic despite having a broken jaw. However, under coach William Waddell, he was mostly a second choice player and was not in the squad in one of the biggest successes of the club's history, the triumph in the 1972 European Cup Winners' Cup Final.

It was only after Jock Wallace took over as coach that he became increasingly used, often as a substitute. As a regular from the mid-1970s, he won multiple titles, contributing to three Scottish Football League championships, three Scottish Cups (also losing in four further finals) and five Scottish League Cups.

Coaching career

Early coaching career
Miller was appointed as player-manager when he played briefly for South China in Hong Kong in 1983, but was unable to save the club from relegation. He then had the same role at Morton in the first part of the 1983–84 season before contentiously joining the Greenock club's rivals, St Mirren, who were at that time in a higher division.

St Mirren
Miller managed St Mirren from 1983 until 1986. He guided the Paisley club to qualification for European competition. One of their all-time great nights came in a European campaign when in 1985, Slavia Prague were knocked out after a 3–0 Saints win at Love Street. Miller moulded a side that would win the 1987 Scottish Cup Final, but departed during that season.

Hibernian
Miller was then manager of Hibernian from 1986 to 1996, through a "difficult" period in the club's history, as the club came through financial problems. He led the team to victory in the 1991–92 Scottish League Cup, beating Rangers in the semi-final (1–0) and Dunfermline Athletic in the final (2–0). Hibs qualified for the UEFA Cup, losing on the away goals rule to RSC Anderlecht, then reached the 1993 Scottish League Cup Final, but this time lost out to Rangers (1–2). Hibs finished the 1994–95 season in third place in the league. Miller was sacked by Hibs in 1996, with some observers accusing him of having betrayed Hibs' "cavalier ideals".

Coventry and Aberdeen
Miller then moved to Coventry City, accepting an offer from his Scottish compatriot Gordon Strachan to become assistant manager. A year later, unable to resist the challenge of being his own man again, he moved to Aberdeen taking over the manager's post from Roy Aitken. However this stint was not a successful one and he was replaced in 1998 by Paul Hegarty.

Liverpool
Miller joined English Premier League side Liverpool as Director of Scouting under Gérard Houllier in 1999. However, when Rafael Benítez was appointed manager of Liverpool in 2004, he overhauled the scouting system. Miller then subsequently worked as first team coach, helping the club win the Champions League in 2005 and the FA Cup in 2006. Miller left Liverpool in May 2008 to manage Japanese side JEF United Chiba.

JEF United Chiba
Despite taking over the club when they had taken just two points from eleven games, Miller managed to guide the team to safety from relegation. However, following a string of poor results in the next season which the club was in the relegation zone, Miller's contract was terminated by the club in July 2009.

AIK
Miller was appointed manager of Swedish team AIK in June 2010 as the successor of Mikael Stahre and the interim solution Björn Wesström. AIK had been in some danger of relegation when Miller was appointed, but they eventually finished 11th in the 16-team division.

Sibir Novosibirsk
Miller was appointed head coach of Russian First Division club Sibir Novosibirsk in January 2012. Miller became the first British head coach in Russian football. Miller left the club after just nine matches in charge.

Return to St Mirren
Miller returned to St Mirren on 3 November 2015, as assistant manager to Ian Murray. He became caretaker manager after Murray resigned in December.

Managerial statistics

Personal life 
Two of Miller's sons, Graeme and Greg, both played for Hibs while Miller was manager there. Miller also employed Greg as a coach while he was manager of JEF United Chiba.

Honours

Manager
St Mirren
Renfrewshire Cup : 1983–84, 1984–85, 1985–86

Hibernian
Scottish League Cup : 1991–92
1990 Tennent's Sixes
East of Scotland Shield : 1989–90

Aberdeen
Aberdeenshire Cup : 1997–98

References

External links 

Living people
1949 births
Footballers from Glasgow
Scottish footballers
Scottish expatriate footballers
Association football defenders
Scottish Football League players
Hong Kong First Division League players
Rangers F.C. players
South China AA players
Greenock Morton F.C. players
Scottish football managers
Scottish expatriate football managers
AIK Fotboll managers
South China AA managers
Greenock Morton F.C. managers
St Mirren F.C. managers
Hibernian F.C. managers
Scottish expatriate sportspeople in Hong Kong
Aberdeen F.C. managers
Liverpool F.C. non-playing staff
J1 League managers
JEF United Chiba managers
Expatriate football managers in Japan
Expatriate football managers in Sweden
Greenock Morton F.C. non-playing staff
Scottish Premier League managers
FC Sibir Novosibirsk managers
Expatriate football managers in Russia
St Mirren F.C. non-playing staff
Scottish Football League managers
Association football coaches